Biotin sulfoxide is the substance that is formed when biotin is exposed to certain oxidants, including ultraviolet light in the presence of oxygen.

References

Nitrogen heterocycles
Sulfur heterocycles
Sulfoxides
Heterocyclic compounds with 2 rings
Carboxylic acids